Terki fortress, Terka, or Terek (originally Shamkhalian Tyumen's fortress, later Tersky redoubt, sometimes mentioned as Terskiy town) was a Russian fortress in the Caucasus in the 16-18th centuries. It was originally erected at the mouth of the Sunzha river on the lands of the Tyumen Khanate, it was demolished several times, restored and transferred.

Later the town was formed in the Terek delta on the Tyumenka River, which had later disappeared in the XVIII century. The territory where the town existed corresponded to modern northeastern Dagestan (Kizlyarsky District, the left bank of the Stary Terek channel northeast of Kizlyar).

The town of Terek was a stronghold serving the expansion of the Russian state in the North Caucasus and the Western Caspian region, its location made it an important military and strategic point on the southern outskirts of the country. Administratively, it belonged to the Astrakhan region, had his own governor, who, in turn, was subordinate to the Astrakhan governor. In its heyday (17th century - the first years of the 18th century), the town was the second largest and most important in the region after Astrakhan, many trade routes were controlled here. In the first years of the 18th century, the successful development of the Terek city was interrupted as a result of the raid of the Lesser Nogai Horde (Old Russian "Kuban Tatars"). The city turned into a purely military settlement, which was soon abandoned.

References 

History of Krasnodar Krai
History of Rostov Oblast
History of Kalmykia
Former populated places in Russia
History of Kumyks
History of the North Caucasus
History of the Caucasus